The Brooklyn Side is the second studio album by St. Louis, Missouri-based roots rock band the Bottle Rockets. It was originally released on East Side Digital in 1994, and was produced by Eric Ambel. It soon received many favorable reviews from critics, which prompted Atlantic Records to sign the band to their roster, after which they reissued the album in 1995.

Critical reception

The Brooklyn Side placed at number 35 on The Village Voices year-end Pazz & Jop critics' poll.

Track listing

2013 reissue with Bottle Rockets

On November 19, 2013, Bloodshot Records reissued a remastered version of both The Brooklyn Side and the band's previous album, 1993's Bottle Rockets. This reissue also included live and demo versions of some of the albums' songs.

References

1994 albums
The Bottle Rockets albums
TAG Recordings albums
Atlantic Records albums
Albums produced by Eric Ambel